A conclusive presumption, also known as an irrebuttable presumption, is a type of presumption used in several legal systems. In English law, a conclusive presumption is a presumption of law that cannot be rebutted by evidence and must be taken to be the case whatever the evidence to the contrary. For example, a child below the age of criminal responsibility is presumed to be incapable of committing a felony.

Australia
In Australian law, it is a conclusive presumption that no child under the age of 10 can be held responsible for criminal action. This presumption exists to protect children by acknowledging that they do not have sufficient development to understand the gravity and consequences of committing a criminal act.

Canada
Recent amendments to Impaired Driving law allows the Crown to rely on a conclusive presumption. Normally, where the police conduct a breathalyzer test within 2 hours of the operation of a conveyance (or care and control), the court can accept the blood alcohol concentration as being the same at the time of the operation of the vehicle as at the time of the offence. If the test is conducted outside the two hours, and the blood alcohol concentration is greater than 20 mg of alcohol/100 mL of blood, there is now a conclusive presumption that the blood alcohol concentration can be increased by 5 mg of alcohol/100 mL of blood for each 30 minutes.

England and Wales
A child below the age of criminal responsibility cannot be held legally responsible for his or her actions, and so cannot be convicted of committing a criminal offence. The age has continually been under debate with adjustments being made in line with rulings, the results of psychological research and to some extent public pressure. The age was seven at common law, and raised by the Children and Young Persons Act 1933 to eight (section 50) and by the Children and Young Persons Act 1963 to ten, at which it remains. In the case of rape, if it is found that the defendant intentionally deceived the complainant as to the "nature or the purpose of the act", or if "the defendant intentionally induced the complainant to consent by impersonation of a "person known personally to the complainant"" it can be conclusively presumed the defendant is guilty of rape and must be convicted.

See also
Rebuttable presumption
Presumption of fact

References

Other references
 Phillips, John M., "Irrebuttable Presumptions: An Illusory Analysis", (1975) 27 Stanford Law Review 449

English law
Evidence law